Abid Ali Akbar is a Pakistani tennis player. 

Abid received his education from the University of Idaho. He has won two national titles in singles and eight in doubles. He is currently studying at the University of Reno.

References

Pakistani tennis players
University of Idaho alumni
Living people
Year of birth missing (living people)